Fin de siècle is a French term meaning the end of the century.

Fin de siècle may also refer to:

 Fin de Siècle (album), 1998 pop album by The Divine Comedy
 Fin de siecle (album), 2000 Gothic rock album by Closterkeller
 Fin-de-siècle Vienna, 1980 non-fiction book by Carl E. Schorske